Greatest Hits is a compilation album by the Lebanese singer Najwa Karam.

Track listing
"Saharni"
"Edhak Lil Dounya"
"Ewa Tekoun Zealt"
"Tahamouni"
"Roba'I Wa Khomasi" (Live)
"Nedmaneh"
"Ashqah"
"Oyoun Qalbi"
"Ma Bassmahlak"
"Maghrouumeh"
"Ana Meen"
"Rouh Rouhi"
"Atshana"
"Khaleek al-Ardh"
"Majbourah"
"Naghmet Hob"
"Ya Habayeb"

2004 greatest hits albums
Najwa Karam albums